World Series of Poker: Full House Pro is a video game  poker variant Texas hold 'em developed by Pipeworks Studios, published by Microsoft Games Studios for Xbox 360 as an Xbox Live Arcade title and Windows 8. The game is the sequel to Full House Poker using the World Series of Poker license. The game was released globally on September 4, 2013.

The game is available free of charge on Xbox Live, and players get free bonus chips every 12 hours, and even more if they claim the bonus chips consecutively. Players can also purchase chips and gold with real money; chips can be spent in games or in the in-game store, and gold is used to purchase exclusive items.

Pipeworks Studios announced that the servers for World Series of Poker: Full House Pro would close on March 4, 2015, and the game is now delisted from the marketplace. While it went on hiatus, the servers for the game were shut down at 12 pm PST on March 4, 2015.

References

2013 video games
Poker video games
World Series of Poker
Microsoft games
Mobile games
Video games developed in the United States
Xbox 360 games
Xbox 360 Live Arcade games
Windows games
Pipeworks Studios games
Multiplayer and single-player video games